Soline Lamboley (born 11 October 1996) is a French professional racing cyclist. She rode at the 2015 UCI Track Cycling World Championships. She is the granddaughter of Jean-Jacques Lamboley.

Major results

2013
1st  Points race, French National Track Championships – Junior
2nd Omnium, UCI Track World Championships - Junior
2nd 500 m, French National Track Championships – Junior
2nd Sprint, French National Track Championships – Junior
3rd Omnium, European Track Championships - Junior
2014
Prova Internacional de Anadia
1st Scratch Race
2nd Omnium
2nd Scratch Race, International Belgian Open
1st  National Road Race Championship - Junior
2nd Scratch, UCI Track World Championships - Junior
2nd 500 m, French National Track Championships – Junior
3rd Omnium, UCI Track World Championships - Junior
3rd Omnium, European Track Championships - Junior
3rd Team Pursuit, European Track Championships - Junior
3rd Pursuit, French National Track Championships – Junior
2015
1st  Scratch, European Track Championships - U23 
2nd Omnium, French National Track Championships 
3rd Points race, French National Track Championships 
3rd National Road Race Championship - U23
2016
2nd  Scratch Race, UEC U23 European Track Championships 
3rd French National Road Cup - 4th stage

References

External links
 

1996 births
Living people
French female cyclists
Cyclists at the 2015 European Games
European Games competitors for France
French track cyclists
Sportspeople from Haute-Saône
Cyclists from Bourgogne-Franche-Comté